Jesper Holmris (born 21 December 1970) is a Danish handball coach for Ringkøbing Håndbold.  

He also coach the Chinese women's national team.

At the 2012 Summer Olympics he coached the Great Britain women's national handball team. At the 2017 World Women's Handball Championship he coaches the China women's national handball team.

References

1970 births
Living people
Danish handball coaches
Danish expatriate sportspeople in China
Danish expatriate sportspeople in the United Kingdom